Rudd-Rockford-Marble Rock Community School District (RRMR) is a rural public school district headquartered in Rockford, Iowa. It operates the RRMR Elementary School/Preschool and RRMR Junior-Senior High School, both in Rockford.

The district is mostly in Floyd County with sections in Cerro Gordo and Mitchell counties. In addition to Rockford, it serves Marble Rock and Rudd.

History

In 2008, Keith Turner became the principal of the RRMR secondary school, and he was named superintendent, with his secondary principal duties continuing, in 2014.

In 2017, Turner asked the school board to consider enacting an agreement with another school district to share superintendents. The district is also, as a way to reduce expenses, considering establishing a solar panel array. At the time the district's enrollment and funding from the State of Iowa were decreasing, though Turner stated that the finances were in "pretty good shape".

Schools
The district operates two schools in a single building in Rockford:
 RRMR Elementary School
 Rockford Jr.-Sr. High School

Rockford Jr.-Sr. High School

Athletics
The Warriors participate in the Top of Iowa Conference in the following sports:
Football
Cross Country
Volleyball
Basketball
Bowling
Wrestling
Golf
 Girls' 2000 Class 1A State Champions
Track and Field
Baseball
Softball

See also
List of school districts in Iowa
List of high schools in Iowa

References

External links
 Rudd-Rockford-Marble Rock Community School District

School districts in Iowa
Education in Cerro Gordo County, Iowa
Education in Floyd County, Iowa
Education in Mitchell County, Iowa
School districts established in 1959
1959 establishments in Iowa